Jeong Yoon-soo (born October 23, 1962) is a South Korean film director.

Filmography
As director:
 Love, In Between (2010)
 My Wife Got Married (2008)
 Love Now (2007)
 Yesterday (2002)

References

External links
 
 

South Korean film directors
1962 births
Living people